Eralio Cabrera (born 23 August 1945) is a Cuban rower. He competed at the 1968 Summer Olympics and the 1972 Summer Olympics.

References

1945 births
Living people
Cuban male rowers
Olympic rowers of Cuba
Rowers at the 1968 Summer Olympics
Rowers at the 1972 Summer Olympics
Sportspeople from Matanzas
Pan American Games medalists in rowing
Pan American Games silver medalists for Cuba
Rowers at the 1971 Pan American Games